Mary Cronk  (1934 – 21 December 2018) was an independent midwife from Scotland who was awarded her MBE for services to midwifery over her many years of practice.

Early life
Cronk was born in Glasgow in 1932, the daughter of a Clydeside ship worker. She first studied nursing at Glasgow Royal Infirmary, and in 1957 started training to be a midwife at Queen Charlotte's in London.

Career
Cronk worked for the National Health Service in the UK where she facilitated more than 1600 births, mainly as home births.  In 1991, she opened her own practice and started working as an independent midwife. 

Cronk joined the English National Board of the United Kingdom Central Council for Nursing, Midwifery and Health Visiting, and served on the RCM Council between September 1999 and August 2003.

Cronk also wrote many articles on midwifery, covering a variety of topics, including physiological breech birth, of which she was a proponent. These have been published in Midwifery Matters and AIMS Journal, as well as quoted in various books.

Once retired, Cronk continued to educate by hosting study days alongside fellow independent midwife Jane Evans; the pair disseminated information on unusual but normal births, including breech birth.

Obituary
Cronk died on the 21st of December 2018, aged 86.

Selected publications
"The Midwife: A Professional Servant?". 2000. in  Chapter 4.
"Community midwifery: a practical guide". with Caroline Flint 1989
Radical Midwifery: Celebrating 21 Years of A.R.M. 1997. Margaret Jowitt, Ishbel Kargar, with contributions by Cronk
"Keep Your Hands off the Breech". AIMS Journal, Vol 10 No 3. 1998.

References

External links 

Sharing the Skills website - http://www.sharingtheskills.co.uk/index.php?lng=en

1932 births
2018 deaths
English midwives